Patched Domain-Containing Protein 4 (PTCHD4) is a protein, which in humans is encoded by the Patched Domain-Containing Protein 4 gene.  It is otherwise known by the aliases: PTCHD4, C6orf138, dj402H5.2, and by the accession number BC137364.

Homology

Orthologs
Sequenced distant orthologs of human PTCHD4 have been found as far back in evolution as mold, which shows a conservation of 16% identity.  Strict orthologs include boneless fish, but not echinoderms, insects, or plants.

(ORTHOLOG TABLE IMAGE)
Figure 1: Table of example orthologs

(SCATTER PLOT IMAGE)
Figure 2: Scatter plot of conservation with human PTCHD4 versus date of divergence in millions of years ago

Paralogs

PTCHD4 has three other genes in its family: PTCHD1, PTCHD2, and PTCHD3, as well as the Niemann-Pick disease type C protein.  These paralogs are far less conserved than strict orthologs, which may suggest that they split long before speciation.

Gene
Human PTCHD4 is located on the negative strand of chromosome 6, at 6p12.3.  From there, it covers 190,350 base pairs, which includes three exons and two introns.

(LOCATION IMAGE)
Figure 3, which shows the location of gene PTCHD4 on chromosome 6, is courtesy of GeneCards.org.

Expression
Nominal expression of PTCHD4 was found in the brain, connective tissue, embryonic tissue, lungs, placenta, testis, trachea, and uterus, with the greatest expression in the trachea.  Nominal expression was also found in the following disease states:  chondrosarcoma, germ cell tumors, non-neoplasia, and uterine tumors.  Protein localization was found in all tissues examined except the salivary glands, yet RNA expression was scarcely found anywhere.  This may suggest that PTCHD4 protein is particularly resilient to degradation, and that it is only produced under key circumstances or at key life stages.

Protein
Homo sapiens PTCHD4 variant 1 is 846 amino acids in length, weighs 96.4 kilodaltons, and has an isoelectric point of 8.8.  It has two isomers, which are denoted as variant 2 and variant X1.  It is phenylalanine rich, and found in the cell membrane.

Structure
Phyre2  extrapolated the following 3D secondary structure with 100% certainty after analyzing 745 residues, (an 88% majority) of PTCHD4’s human protein sequence.  Results were remarkably similar in such distant orthologs as earthworms, boneless fish, and green algae. There are an estimate 10 transmembrane helices.

(STRUCTURE)

Predicted Function
PTCHD4 has been implicated as an integral component of cellular membrane, and as a protein receptor in the hedgehog pathway.  The later of these two functions causes an inhibitory effect during the development of embryonic cells in all bilaterians and vertebrates.  In mammals, the hedgehog pathway is vital to the proper development of the brain, skeleton, musculature, gastrointestinal tract, and lungs.  It also appears to be important to adult animals, as it has been implicated in the regulation of adult stem cells, while its malfunction is associated basal cell carcinoma.

References

Proteins